Karl Friedrich Becker (11 March 1777 – 15 March 1806) was a German educator and historian. His most noted work was World History for Children and Teachers of Children which was widely used and much edited and revised by other noted historians after Becker's death.

Biography
Becker was a native of Berlin. He studied history and philosophy at the University of Halle, and after finishing his studies, worked as a tutor in Cottbus. From 1798 to 1800 he was a schoolteacher in Berlin, but due to poor health had to resign from teaching and devote his time to literary and historical work. Becker died on 15 March 1806 at the age of 29. His grave is preserved in the Protestant Friedhof I der Jerusalems- und Neuen Kirchengemeinde (Cemetery No. I of the congregations of Jerusalem's Church and New Church) in Berlin-Kreuzberg, south of Hallesches Tor.

Works
Becker is remembered today as author of the nine-volume Weltgeschichte für Kinder und Kinderlehrer. This work was published in Berlin between 1801 and 1805, and after his death was continued, edited and revised by numerous authors. Karl Ludwig Woltmann added a tenth volume, and Karl Adolf Menzel two more. Wilhelm Adolf Schmidt's edition of 1860-67 contains 20 volumes, including Karl Eduard Arnd's Geschichte der letzten vierzig Jahre and its continuations to 1867. The same author's Geschichte der Jahre 1867-1871 (1st vol., 1872) also served as a supplement. Johann Wilhelm Löbell was an editor. Though gaining in fullness and accuracy, the revisions lost something of the charm of Becker's original presentation.

Other publications by Becker include:
 Tales from history for young people (3 vols., 1801-1803, Halle; 4th vol. by Günther, 1842, containing Die Perserkriege; 9th and revised ed. by Eckstein, 1857; later edition by Hermann Masius, 1873)
 Poetry from the Viewpoint of the Historian (Berlin, 1803)

References 
“Becker, Karl Friedrich” in Meyers Konversations-Lexikon (4th edition) 

 Portions of this article are based on a translation of the article on Karl Friedrich Becker from the German Wikipedia.

External links 

 
 

19th-century German historians
German schoolteachers
1806 deaths
1777 births
Writers from Berlin
German male non-fiction writers